Ellsworth–Federal is a subway station on SEPTA's Broad Street Line in South Philadelphia, Pennsylvania. The station opened on September 18, 1938, and is located at the western edge of the Italian Market on Broad Street, between Ellsworth and Federal Streets.  It is also close to the Washington Avenue Historic District.  It is served by Broad Street Line local trains only, with one platform.

In addition to the Italian Market, the station also provides access to busy Washington Avenue (one block north of the Ellsworth exit) and, approximately five blocks east, the landmark competing cheesesteak vendors Geno's Steaks and Pat's King of Steaks.

Station layout
There are four street entrances to the station, two at Broad and Ellsworth streets, as well as two at Broad and Federal streets.

Gallery

References

External links

 Ellsworth Street entrance from Google Maps Street View
 Federal Street entrance from Google Maps Street View

SEPTA Broad Street Line stations
Railway stations in the United States opened in 1938
Railway stations located underground in Pennsylvania